The 2011–12 Luxembourg National Division was the 98th season of top-tier football in Luxembourg. It began on 5 August 2011 and ended on 13 May 2012. F91 Dudelange were the defending champions having won their ninth league championship in the previous season.

Team changes from 2010–11
Etzella Ettelbruck and Jeunesse Canach were relegated to the Division of Honour after finishing 13th and 14th in the previous season. Jeunesse Canach were relegated after one year in the top flight while Etzella leave after an eight-year stay in the league. They were replaced by 2010–11 Division of Honour champions Union 05 Kayl-Tétange and runners-up Rumelange. Kayl-Tétange are taking part in this competition for the first time in their history, while Rumelange return to the league after a one-year absence.

Wiltz 71 as 12th-placed team had to compete in a single play-off match against 3rd-placed Division of Honour side Hostert. Hostert won the match after a penalty shootout, thus winning promotion to the league for the first time in their history. Meanwhile, Wiltz 71 were relegated after one year in the league.

Stadia and locations

League table

Results

Relegation play-offs
The 12th-placed club in the National Division, Swift Hesperange, competed in a relegation play-off match against the third-placed team from the Division of Honour, Wiltz, for one spot in the following season's competition. Wiltz won the match by 6 goals to 2, and they returned to the top division after a one-year absence. Swift Hesperange were relegated to the Division of Honour after an eleven-year stay in the top division.

Top goalscorers

See also
 2011–12 Luxembourg Cup

References

Luxembourg National Division seasons
Luxembourg National Division
1